Maharajpur is a tehsil and a nagar palika parishad in Chhatarpur district in the Indian state of Madhya Pradesh.

Geography

Demographics

As of the 2011 Census of India, Maharajpur had a population of 21,532. Males constitute 53% of the population and females 47%. Maharajpur has an average literacy rate of 53%, lower than the national average of 59.5%: male literacy is 63%, and female literacy is 43%. In Maharajpur, 16% of the population is under six years of age.

People 
The current MLA from Maharajpur is Neeraj Dixit who fought from congress seat and won.

References

Cities and towns in Chhindwara district
Bundelkhand
Chhatarpur